GO 11 is a Floating dry dock of the Marina Militare.

History 
Based at Taranto Naval Station, in 2012.

References

External links
 Ships Marina Militare website

Ships built in Italy
Auxiliary ships of the Italian Navy
1919 ships
Floating drydocks